"Full Stop" is a song written and recorded by Hong Kong singer-songwriter G.E.M. for her seventh studio album City Zoo (2019). G.E.M. produced the song with Terrence Ma, and it was released on November 22, 2019, by Sony Music Taiwan. as the lead single from the album. "Full Stop" is a Mandopop genre song. Over a retro-styled musical motif, G.E.M. sings lyrics about devotion to the drama of her previous record label,  Hummingbird Music Limited.

The music video for "Full Stop" was directed by Birdy Nio. The video was published on November 22, 2019, the video is set in the forest and green land, and shows the drama of G.E.M. and her previous company.

Background and composition
G.E.M. reviewed the 12-year career with the song "Full Stop". She once learned a blank piece of paper. Some things that can't be conceded and tolerant to others are cruel to herself. She also hopes to use songs to encourage all those who stand at the crossroads of life and are confused about the future. Those who are in the middle of the authorities are confused and look up at the vast sky. No matter how hard the front is, it is right to face the challenge. It is not so difficult to draw a "full stop". The representative animal of this song is hummingbird.

Music video
The music video was released on YouTube on November 22, 2019 the same day of the single released. The music video was directed by Birdy Nio. The music hair style of the music video was using her previous albums', "18...", "My Secret" and "All About U" hair style. The music video earned a million views on the first day of released. It earned 2 million views on the following day. As of June 2020, the music video has gained over 28 million views.

Credits and personnel
 G.E.M. – vocals, songwriter, producer
 Terrence Ma – producer
 Richard Furch – mixer, producer

Release history

References

2019 songs